Monika Konrad Hildegard Hellwig (10 December 1929 – 30 September 2005) was a German-born British academic, author, educator and theologian, who spent much of her life in the United States. A former Religious Sister, she left her community to pursue her academic career, becoming a professor at Georgetown University and later being named as President/Executive Director of the Association of Catholic Colleges and Universities (1996–2005).

Early life and education
Hellwig was born in 1929 in Breslau, Germany, to a German Catholic father and a Dutch Jewish mother, who was a noted sculptor. When the Nazis came to power, the family moved several times to avoid arrest. First the family moved to the Netherlands. Later, after the German invasion of the Netherlands, the eight-year-old Hellwig and her sisters, Marianne and Angelika, were sent to a boarding school in Scotland by their parents. Her father was later killed by the Nazi authorities. She was briefly reunited with her mother in 1946, only to see her die a few days after that reunion. That same year, aged 15, she began her higher education at the University of Liverpool, from which she received degrees in law (1949) and social science (1951).

Hellwig left England and moved to the United States in the early 1950s, where she joined the Medical Mission Sisters, a Roman Catholic religious institute of women based in Philadelphia, Pennsylvania, which had been founded to provide medical care to the poor of the world. After her novitiate, she attended Catholic University for her master's degree in theology, which she received in 1956. She returned to that university for a doctoral degree in theology (1966).

Career
In 1963 Hellwig was sent to Rome, where she served as a research assistant to a Vatican official during the Second Vatican Council, one of the few women allowed unfettered access as an observer at Council sessions.  Fourteen years after she took her vows, in order to pursue better her work, she requested a dispensation from her vows by the Holy See, which granted her this. Thereafter, in addition to lecturing at many universities,  Hellwig taught for more than three decades at Georgetown University, including six years as the Landegger Distinguished Professor of Theology.

Hellwig wrote many books, including Understanding Catholicism (1981), Jesus, the Compassion of God (1992), and The Eucharist and the Hunger of the World (1976). In 1985, she delivered the inaugural Madeleva Lecture at St. Mary's College, in a series that highlights the work of women in theology. While serving as President of the Catholic Theological Society of America, in 1986 she co-signed a controversial letter in support of Charles E. Curran, a Catholic priest and professor at the Catholic University of America, who "had been stripped of his authority to teach in Catholic universities because of his dissent from the church's teachings on such issues as contraception and homosexuality." In 1996 she became president and executive director of the Association of Catholic Colleges and Universities, retaining the position until a few months before her death. She was also a senior research fellow at Georgetown's Woodstock Theological Center at the time of her death.  Dolores Leckey, the 1991 Madeleva Lecturer, was a senior research fellow at the Woodstock Theological Center at the same time. Leckey (with Kathleen Dolphin) would go on to publish Monika K. Hellwig: the people's theologian  in 2010.

Personal life
Hellwig adopted two sons and a daughter, who survived her. She retained her British nationality while working and living in the United States.

Death
Hellwig died on 30 September 2005, aged 75, at Washington Hospital Center from a cerebral hemorrhage. Following her death, the National Catholic Reporter referred to Hellwig's "near encyclopedic knowledge of Catholicism, which might be expected of the coauthor of the Modern Catholic Encyclopedia."

Education
 University of Liverpool - law degree (1949), social science degree (1951)
 Catholic University of America - master's degree in theology (1956), doctorate

See also

References

External links

Monika Hellwig's papers (1966-2005) are held in the Georgetown University archives.

1929 births
2005 deaths
Silesian Jews
Jewish emigrants from Nazi Germany to the United Kingdom
Naturalised citizens of the United Kingdom
Alumni of the University of Liverpool
20th-century British Roman Catholic nuns
Participants in the Second Vatican Council
Catholic University of America alumni
Former Roman Catholic religious sisters and nuns
Georgetown University faculty
British expatriate academics in the United States
British Christian theologians
British women writers
People from the Province of Lower Silesia
Women religious writers
Presidents of the Catholic Theological Society of America